Pedro Martínez is a municipality located in the province of Granada, in Spain. , Pedro Martínez had a population of 1,232.

References

Municipalities in the Province of Granada